Ivan Lendrić (born 8 August 1991) is a Croatian professional footballer who plays as a centre-forward for Croatian side Hrvatski Dragovoljac.

Club career
Born in Split, Lendrić rose through the ranks of the Hajduk Split Academy. In the 2009–10 season, his last youth level season, Lendrić was top scorer of the Croatian academy league and was voted best youth player by the Croatian sports daily Sportske novosti.

He turned professional in July 2010, but failed to break into the first team under coach Stanko Poklepović so he was loaned to Bosnian Premier League club Zrinjski Mostar. While at Zrinjski, Lendrić became top scorer in the 2010–11 Bosnian championship with 16 goals.

In summer 2011, he returned from the loan and joined the first team under coach Krasimir Balakov. In his first professional season with Hajduk, he scored four goals in nineteen appearances, playing mostly as a substitute.

In June 2012, Lendrić signed a three-year contract with Belgian club Zulte Waregem.

After a moderately successful season at Zulte Waregem, Lokomotiva decided to bring the player back to the 1. HNL in a €500,000 deal. In January 2014, his contract with Lokomotiva was terminated after just six first team appearances and no goals.

In February 2014, Lenrić signed with the Austrian Football Second League side Kapfenberger SV, where he scored five goals in fifteen appearances. On 30 August 2014, Lendrić signed with Italian side FC Südtirol.

In 2015, Lendrić played for Celje, Milsami Orhei, and PAE Kerkyra.

On 5 January 2016, Lendrić joined Bosnian Premier League side Željezničar. Željezničar finished the 2016–17 season as runners-up, with Lendrić becoming the league's top goalscorer with 19 goals.

Lendrić then moved to French Ligue 2 club Lens for a €300,000 fee in July 2017, and signed a three-year contract. After one season with Lens, his contract was terminated in June 2018.

Lendrić went on trial with Scottish Premiership club Hibernian in July 2018, but was not offered a contract.

On 8 August 2018, Lendrić signed with Slovenian club Olimpija Ljubljana. He scored his first and only goal for the club on his debut in a cup game on 29 September against Triglav Kranj. On 4 December 2018, after only four months at Olimpija, Lendrić left the club.

On 24 December 2018, Lendrić became the new player of Romanian First League club Hermannstadt. He scored his first goal for Hermannstadt on 19 April 2019, in a 1–1 home draw against Voluntari.

On 21 June 2019, Lendrić returned to Bosnia and Herzegovina and signed a two-year contract with Zrinjski Mostar, the club he played for in the 2010–11 season. He made his official debut and scored his first goal for Zrinjski since 2011 on 11 July 2019, in a 3–0 away win against Akademija Pandev in the 2019–20 UEFA Europa League first qualifying round. Lendrić made his first league appearance for Zrinjski after nine years on 21 July 2019, in a 1–0 away loss against Sarajevo. He scored his first league goal since his return to Zrinjski on 24 August 2019, in a 4–0 home win against Borac Banja Luka. On 10 December 2019, Lendrić decided to terminate his contract with Zrinjski and left the club.

Two-and-a-half years after leaving Željezničar, on 7 January 2020, he returned to the Sarajevo-based club, signing a one-and-a-half year contract. He played his first official match after his return to Željezničar on 22 February 2020, a 0–0 league draw against Radnik Bijeljina on 22 February 2020. The first goal he scored since his return to the club was in a 3–0 win against Zvijezda 09 on 29 February 2020. Lendrić left Željezničar in May 2021.

International career
Internationally, Lendrić represented Croatia at all youth levels and was part of the squad that was called up for the 2011 FIFA U-20 World Cup by manager Ivica Grnja, where he scored a goal in Croatia's 5–2 defeat against Nigeria.

Career statistics

Club

Honours

Individual
Performance
Bosnian Premier League Top Goalscorer: 2010–11 (16 goals), 2016–17 (19 goals)

References

External links
 

Profile at L'Équipe

1991 births
Living people
Footballers from Split, Croatia
Association football forwards
Croatian footballers
Croatia youth international footballers
Croatia under-21 international footballers
HNK Hajduk Split players
HŠK Zrinjski Mostar players
S.V. Zulte Waregem players
NK Lokomotiva Zagreb players
Kapfenberger SV players
F.C. Südtirol players
NK Celje players
PAE Kerkyra players
FK Željezničar Sarajevo players
RC Lens players
NK Olimpija Ljubljana (2005) players
FC Hermannstadt players
FC Tsarsko Selo Sofia players
K. Rupel Boom F.C. players
Croatian Football League players
Premier League of Bosnia and Herzegovina players
Belgian Pro League players
2. Liga (Austria) players
Serie C players
Slovenian PrvaLiga players
Super League Greece 2 players
Ligue 2 players
Championnat National 2 players
Liga I players
First Professional Football League (Bulgaria) players
Belgian National Division 1 players
Croatian expatriate footballers
Expatriate footballers in Bosnia and Herzegovina
Expatriate footballers in Belgium
Expatriate footballers in Austria
Expatriate footballers in Italy
Expatriate footballers in Slovenia
Expatriate footballers in Moldova
Expatriate footballers in Greece
Expatriate footballers in France
Expatriate footballers in Romania
Expatriate footballers in Bulgaria
Croatian expatriate sportspeople in Bosnia and Herzegovina
Croatian expatriate sportspeople in Belgium
Croatian expatriate sportspeople in Austria
Croatian expatriate sportspeople in Italy
Croatian expatriate sportspeople in Slovenia
Croatian expatriate sportspeople in Moldova
Croatian expatriate sportspeople in Greece
Croatian expatriate sportspeople in France
Croatian expatriate sportspeople in Romania
Croatian expatriate sportspeople in Bulgaria